Cisthene fuscilingua is a moth of the family Erebidae. It was described by Harrison Gray Dyar Jr. in 1914. It is found in Panama.

References

Cisthenina
Moths described in 1914